TweenTribune is a free, not-for-profit online newspaper for children aged 8–15. It is updated daily with stories from the Associated Press that are chosen based on relevancy to pre-adolescents. Kids can post comments to the stories which are moderated by their teachers, and teachers can use the site as a resource for meeting No Child Left Behind requirements for reading, writing and computer skills. The site first appeared on November 21, 2008.

TweenTribune has been featured in articles in the Los Angeles Times, Good Housekeeping and Family Circle magazine.

Financial model
TweenTribune.com is a proof-of-concept model for new ways to fund journalism online. The site employs a series of previously untried methods for building audience and revenue. These strategies grew audience and revenue in a matter of weeks, but it remains too soon to tell whether these strategies are the "silver bullet" that media companies seek to funding journalism in the digital age.

Quoted on Dec. 15, 2009, James Rainey of the Los Angeles Times said founder Alan Jacobson's "ebullient innovation opens a door for an underserved audience and provides the kind of incremental revenue that, strand by strand, eventually just might rope journalism back to a financial mooring."

Business model
To achieve sustainability, the site uses a group of strategies to reduce costs:

1. As of January 2010, all content is provided by outside sources. Stories come from the Associated Press, while comments are generated by children in the form of user-generated content (UGC).

2. Editing of comments is provided by teachers, so editing is distributed among users as a means of reducing cost rather than centralizing editing with a paid staff. This is an example of distributive editing (DE).

3. Primary source code is provided by Drupal, a free, open-source code content management system. The site also depends upon other open-source applications, such as Linux, Apache, PHP and MySQL.

4. All custom source code was written by Ebizon Netinfo of Noida, India which was more economical than developing the code in the US.

Revenue streams
Four diversified revenue streams form a previously untested business model for online news:

1. Local and national advertising is targeted demographically, based on the appeal of the content to a youth audience, and geographically, with specific local ads served up based on the IP address of the user. The user's location determines which ads they see.

2. Sponsorships by national advertisers are targeted demographically, based on the appeal of the adjacent news content. Sponsorships can also be targeted topically, on such subjects as Animals, Technology, Fashion, etc.

3. License fees are paid by local media companies for permission to post their local content as a means of promoting their local brands and creating the next generation of news consumers. In addition, local media companies can sell advertising which is targeted geographically. Newspapers using this model include The Valdosta Daily Times, The Traverse City Record-Eagle and the Brainerd Dispatch. Other newspapers using TweenTribune include the Bakersfield Californian, The Virginian-Pilot and the Free Lance-Star in Fredericksburg, VA.

4."Freemium" model, in which basic features are provided to teachers and students at no cost, with specific value-added features that are provided at an additional, nominal cost.

History
Alan Jacobson, president of BrassTacksDesign, created TweenTribune as a way of helping his 10-year-old daughter with her homework.

Launched on Nov 21, 2008, the site had little traffic in its first year. In October 2009 page views began to jump dramatically after a new promotional campaign was launched that marketed the site directly to teachers — a strategy that had not been tried before.

As of May 2010, the site gets 3.4 million page views per month, and 26,000 teachers are registered. TweenTribune is used in 50,000 classrooms in the U.S., Australia, Canada and Japan.

References

External links

American news websites